Sophie Hamilton (born 28 February 2001) is an English field hockey player who plays as a midfielder for Surbiton and the England and Great Britain national teams.

Club career

Hamilton plays club hockey in the Women's England Hockey League Premier Division for Surbiton.

She joined them after playing in the USA for UConn Huskies in 2019 and 2020.
Hamilton has also played for Clifton Robinsons and Team Bath Buccaneers.

Personal life
She has a twin sister, Liv, who plays with her on the national team.

References

External links

 UConn Huskies bio

2001 births
Living people
English female field hockey players
Women's England Hockey League players
Twin sportspeople
English twins
UConn Huskies field hockey players
Field hockey players at the 2022 Commonwealth Games
Commonwealth Games gold medallists for England
Commonwealth Games medallists in field hockey
Medallists at the 2022 Commonwealth Games